5th Group may refer to:

 5th Group CIS, a unit of the Belgian Army 
 5th Special Forces Group (United States), a unit of the United States Army
 5th Group (Observation), later 5th Group (Composite) and currently the 5th Operations Group of the United States Air Force.

See also
 5th Division (disambiguation)
 5th Brigade (disambiguation)
 5th Regiment (disambiguation)
 5th Squadron (disambiguation)